Emamzadeh Abbas (also Romanized as Emāmzādeh ‘Abbās and Imāmzādeh ‘Abbās) is a village in Milajerd Rural District, Milajerd District, Komijan County, Markazi Province, Iran. At the 2006 census, its population was 999, in 224 families.

References 

Populated places in Komijan County